Cheruvathur Sri Mahadeva Temple, located in Kunnamkulam town of Thrissur district of Kerala. The presiding deity of the temple is Shiva, located in main sanctum sanatorium facing east. According to folklore, sage Parasurama has installed the idol. The temple is a part of the 108 famous Shiva temples in Kerala. Most of the ancient temples in Kerala have some mythology narrating its origin. Cheruvathur Sri Mahadeva Temple has numerous legends connecting to its popularity to this day. Most prominent legend is that it is one of the 108 Siva temples of Kerala established by sage Parasurama. Lord Mahadeva in Cheruvathur is worshipped as "Cheruvathurappan" in this temple. The East facing Sanctum sanctorum is placed here in the shape of circular with copper roof.

Location 
While the Cheruvathur village is in Kasaragod district, the Cheruvathur Mahadeva Temple is in Kunnamkulam of Thrissur District and is presumed to be the presiding deity was at Kasaragod district. From there it can be subsequently replaced near Kunnamkulam. Temple situated in Cheruvathur 1 km away from Kunnamkulam town .

See also
 108 Shiva Temples
 Temples of Kerala

Temple Photos

References

108 Shiva Temples
Shiva temples in Kerala
Hindu temples in Thrissur district